The Mount Pleasant Historic District is an historic district in the western part of the Allison Hill neighborhood of Harrisburg, Pennsylvania. It is located from Market to Brookwood and Allison Hill Bluff to 19th street.

Home to mostly Victorian architecture, it is the oldest section of Allison Hill, and represents Harrisburg's early development to the east of downtown. It was entered onto the National Register of Historic Places in 1985.

History
An industry-centered community that was developed between 1880 and 1920 with views of the city of city's commercial and government operations, this area of Harrisburg evolved into a mixture of the typical, working-class brick and wood-construction rowhomes of the area, mansions owned by prominent, late nineteenth and early twentieth-century manufacturers, churches, schools, and industrial structures that were built near the railroad line. 

Among the structures included in the district are the Derry Street United Methodist Church at 1508 Derry Street, which was built in 1908 and known, originally, as the Derry Street United Brethren and Evangelical Church, and the Beidleman House at 1225 Market Street, which was built in 1906 for Edward E. Beidleman, a prominent, twentieth-century politician and attorney.

This historic district was entered onto the National Register of Historic Places in 1985.

Places of note
 Carson Stamm Mansion
 McFarland Press Building
 Old Webster Elementary School
 Sylvan Heights Mansion

See also 
 List of Harrisburg neighborhoods
 National Register of Historic Places listings in Dauphin County, Pennsylvania

References

Further reading
[ National Register Nomination - Map]
[ National Register Nomination - Inventory]

Landmarks in Harrisburg, Pennsylvania
Historic districts in Harrisburg, Pennsylvania
Historic districts on the National Register of Historic Places in Pennsylvania
National Register of Historic Places in Harrisburg, Pennsylvania